Simpsonichthys santanae is a species of killifish from the family Rivulidae native to the Paraná River basin in South America.

References 

Costa, W.J.E.M., 2003. Rivulidae (South American Annual Fishes). p. 526-548. In R.E. Reis, S.O. Kullander and C.J. Ferraris, Jr. (eds.) Checklist of the Freshwater Fishes of South and Central America. Porto Alegre: EDIPUCRS, Brasil.

santanae
Rivulidae
Taxa named by Oscar Akio Shibatta
Taxa named by Júlio César Garavello
Fish described in 2003